Tanew is a river in south-east Poland, a tributary of San.  It starts in Roztocze hills. Tanew has a length of about 113 km and its catchment area is 2339 km². Its tributaries are: Potok Łosiniecki (R), Jeleń (R), Sopot (R), Szum (R), Łada (R), Wirowa (L), Lubienia (L), Złota Nitka (L), Łazowna (L), and Borowina (L).

Rivers of Poland
Rivers of Podkarpackie Voivodeship
Rivers of Lublin Voivodeship